There are two Epistles to the Thessalonians in the Bible:
 First Epistle to the Thessalonians
 Second Epistle to the Thessalonians